Cockney and similar terms may mean:
 In England, Cockney is a dialect spoken mainly by working-class and lower-middle class Londoners, or a label applied to speakers of the dialect; especially people from the East End or born within earshot of Bow Bells
In Australia, a cocknie is a young Australasian snapper fish smaller than legal size
Konkani people, an ethnic group from India

It may also refer to:
Jesse Cockney (born 1989), Canadian cross-country skier

See also